Macaroni casserole is a dish of baked pasta. It is especially known as a staple in northern European home cooking. It is a dish of cooked macaroni and a mixture of egg and milk with additional ingredients like meats, vegetables or fish. It is commonly made with cheese or breadcrumbs sprinkled on top.

The dish is reminiscent of a frittata, with the main difference being that it is baked entirely in the oven. It is usually eaten with ketchup.

Variants by country

Finland

In Finland, the dish is called makaronilaatikko (Finnish) or makaronilåda (Swedish), and is one of the most popular traditional dishes. According to a survey conducted in 2010 with 1,100 respondents, it is the second most popular everyday dish for dinner in Finland. Nowadays, the dish is most commonly made with minced meat, but is traditionally made without meat or cheese. When prepared without meat, it was often used as a replacement for potatoes in the meal and later on, it became a part of the dish that is known today. Macaroni casseroles are readily available in Finnish grocery stores as pre-packaged meals.

Sweden
In Sweden, the dish is called makaronipudding or makaronilåda. The Swedish version is usually made with ham, leek, and cheese.

Malta
In Malta, a baked dish called imqarrun is made with macaroni, bolognese style meat sauce and egg. Other versions add chicken livers, hard boiled eggs, peas and bacon. The macaroni is usually topped with a layer of grated cheese or besciamella (béchamel) that will melt during the baking process and help to bind and set the pasta. This is not to be confused with timpana, which has an outer pastry casing.

North Macedonia
In North Macedonia, the dish is called makaroni vo tava, and is made with macaroni, minced meat and a bolognese-style meat sauce. The macaroni casserole is topped with grated cheese or crumbled white cheese when baking. Can sometimes also include egg, like the Maltese version.

Indonesia

In Indonesia, the dish is sometimes known as makaroni schotel or makaroni schaal. This dish was introduced by the Dutch during the occupation in Indonesia. Therefore, 'Schotel' or 'schaal' (meaning 'dish'), borrowed from Dutch language, refers to the container used to make this food. The Indonesian version is usually made with cheese and meat (smoked beef is widely used, alternatively sausage or tuna.
Potato is sometimes also used).

See also

 Frittata
 Chili mac
 Macaroni and cheese
Kugel
 List of casserole dishes

Sources

External links
Glossary of Finnish Dishes

Macaroni dishes
Casserole dishes
Finnish cuisine
Indonesian cuisine
Macedonian cuisine
Maltese cuisine
Swedish cuisine
Milk dishes